Ellen Marie Falkner  (née Alexander; born 12 June 1979) is an English international lawn and indoor bowler from Cambridge, England. Falkner was appointed Member of the Order of the British Empire (MBE) in the 2020 Birthday Honours for services to lawn bowls.

Personal life
She retired from international bowls and relocated to Australia in 2021 after being appointed as Bowls Australia’s High Performance Manager for Para Bowls.

Bowls career

World Championships
In 2004, she won the gold medal in the fours with Jayne Christie, Jean Baker and Amy Monkhouse at the 2004 World Outdoor Bowls Championship. In 2016, she was part of the fours team with Rebecca Wigfield, Wendy King and Jamie-Lea Winch who won the silver medal at the 2016 World Outdoor Bowls Championship in Christchurch. She then won a bronze medal in the pairs with Sophie Tolchard. In 2020 she was selected for the 2020 World Outdoor Bowls Championship in Australia.

Commonwealth Games
Ellen represented England at the 2002 Commonwealth Games winning gold in the fours and eight years later won another gold at the 2010 Commonwealth Games in the woman's pairs competition with Amy Monkhouse. Ellen also competed in the 2014 Commonwealth Games and won a further gold in the women's triples event with Sophie Tolchard and Sian Gordon. She was selected as part of the England team for the 2018 Commonwealth Games, on the Gold Coast in Queensland where she won a bronze medal in the Triples with Katherine Rednall and Sian Honnor.

World Indoor Championship
Falkner won a third World Indoor singles title during the 2016 World Indoor Bowls Championship after defeating Rebecca Field in the final. This success came ten years after her previous two victories. In 2019 she won the mixed pairs gold with Robert Paxton at the 2019 World Indoor Bowls Championship. At the 2021 World Indoor Bowls Championship Falkner became the first female player to reach the final of the open pairs event (playing with Greg Harlow).

Atlantic Championships
In 2005 she won the triples and fours gold medals at the Atlantic Bowls Championships. After a singles bronze and pairs silver in 2009 she won the fours gold medal and triples silver medal at the 2011 Atlantic Championships in Cyprus. Four years later in 2015 she won the triples silver medal and fours bronze medal at the Championships, also in Cyprus.

National
After winning the 2011 National singles crown she subsequently won the singles at the British Isles Bowls Championships in 2012. She also won the two wood title in 2011 and has won eleven National titles in total; two singles, three CofC, four pairs (2007, 2008, 2012, 2017 all with Sue Alexander), one triples (2007) and one junior title.

National titles
2004 Bowls England National Championships (Women's Junior Pairs)
2007 Bowls England National Championships (Women's Pairs)
2007 Bowls England National Championships (Women's Triples)
2008 Bowls England National Championships (Women's Pairs)
2011 Bowls England National Championships (Women's Singles Four Wood)
2011 Bowls England National Championships (Women's Singles Two Wood)
2012 Bowls England National Championships (Women's Pairs)
2017 Bowls England National Championships (Women's Pairs)
2017 Bowls England National Championships (Women's Champion of Champions)
2019 Bowls England National Championships (Women's Champion of Champions)
2021 Bowls England National Championships (Women's Champion of Champions)

References

External links
 
 
 
 
 

Living people
1979 births
Bowls players at the 2002 Commonwealth Games
Bowls players at the 2006 Commonwealth Games
Bowls players at the 2010 Commonwealth Games
Bowls players at the 2014 Commonwealth Games
Bowls players at the 2018 Commonwealth Games
Commonwealth Games medallists in lawn bowls
Commonwealth Games gold medallists for England
Commonwealth Games silver medallists for England
English female bowls players
People from Wisbech
Sportspeople from Cambridge
Bowls World Champions
Indoor Bowls World Champions
Members of the Order of the British Empire
Medallists at the 2002 Commonwealth Games
Medallists at the 2010 Commonwealth Games
Medallists at the 2014 Commonwealth Games
Medallists at the 2018 Commonwealth Games